Postjesweg is a metro station in Amsterdam Nieuw-West and is served by GVB metro line 50 and 51. There is also a bus stop of line 18 at the north side of the main entrance.

References 

Amsterdam Metro stations